Jim Hall was an American jazz guitarist, composer, and arranger. His discography consists of 39 studio albums, 10 live albums, 1 EP, 1 single, 10 videos, and 22 compilations, all released between 1957 and 2016. In addition, he was a sideman on numerous albums by other artists.

Studio albums (as leader/co-leader) 
 1957: Jazz Guitar (Pacific Jazz, 1957) – reissued in 1964 with overdubbed drums as  The Winner! (Fontana). Also reissued in 2014 as disc 2 of the 10-disc collection Jazz Guitar: Ultimate Collection, Vol. 1 (Documents)
 1957: The Street Swingers with Bob Brookmeyer and Jimmy Raney (World Pacific, 1958)
 1958?: A Girl & a Guitar with Lee Schaefer  (United Artists, 1958)
 1960: Jazz Abstractions with Gunther Schuller (Atlantic, 1961)
 1963: Undercurrent with Bill Evans (United Artists, 1962)
 1964 Two Jims and Zoot with Jimmy Raney and Zoot Sims (Mainstream) – reissued as Otra Vez (Mainstream, 1972)
 1966: Intermodulation with Bill Evans (Verve, 1966)
 1969: It's Nice to Be With You (MPS, 1969)
 1971: Where Would I Be? (Milestone, 1972)
 1975: Concierto (CTI, 1975)
 1976: Commitment (A&M/Horizon, 1976)
 1978: Big Blues with Art Farmer (CTI, 1979)
 1981?: Concierto De Aranjuez with Dave Mathews Orchestra (Electric Bird, 1981)
 1981: First Edition with George Shearing (Concord, 1981)
 1981: Circles (Concord, 1981)
 1982: Studio Trieste with Chet Baker and Hubert Laws (CTI, 1982)
 1986: Jim Hall's Three with Steve LaSpina and Akira Tana (Concord, 1986)
 1988: These Rooms with Tom Harrell, Joey Baron, and Steve LaSpina (Denon, 1988)
 1989: All Across the City with Gil Goldstein, Terry Clarke, and Steve LaSpina (Concord, 1989)
 1982–92: Unissued 1982-1992 (Musica Jazz, 1994)
 1992?: Subsequently (MusicMasters, 1992)
 1992?: Youkali (CTI, 1992)
 1993: Something Special with Larry Goldings and Steve LaSpina (Inner City, 1993)
 1993: Dedications & Inspirations (Telarc, 1994)
 1995: Dialogues (Telarc, 1995)
 1996: Textures (Telarc, 1997)
 1998: By Arrangement (Telarc, 1998)
 1998: Jim Hall & Pat Metheny with Pat Metheny (Telarc, 1999)
 2001: Jim Hall & Basses (Telarc, 2001)
 2004: Magic Meeting with Scott Colley and Lewis Nash (ArtistShare, 2004)
 2004: Duologues with Enrico Pieranunzi (Cam Jazz, 2005)
 2005: Free Association with Geoffrey Keezer  (ArtistShare, 2006)
 2008?: Hemispheres with Bill Frisell, Joey Baron and Scott Colley (ArtistShare, 2008)[2CD]
 2010?: Conversations with Joey Baron (ArtistShare, 2010)

Live albums 
 1972: Alone Together with Ron Carter (Milestone, 1973)
 1975: Jim Hall Live! with Don Thompson and Terry Clarke (Horizon, 1975)
 1975: Jim Hall Live, Vol. 2–4 with Don Thompson and Terry Clarke (ArtistShare, 2012)
 1976: Live in Tokyo (Paddle Wheel, 1980)
 1978: Jim Hall/Red Mitchell with Red Mitchell (Artists House, 1978)
 1982: Live at Village West with Ron Carter  (Concord Jazz, 1984)
 1984: Telephone with Ron Carter (Concord Jazz, 1985)
 1986: Power of Three with Michel Petrucciani and Wayne Shorter (Blue Note, 1987)
 1990: Live at Town Hall, Vols. 1 & 2 (MusicMasters, 1991) – initially released as individual volumes, later released as an omnibus by Jazz Heritage
 1996: Panorama: Live at the Village Vanguard (Telarc, 1997)
 1998: Jazzpar Quartet + 4 (Storyville, 1998) – at Jazzpar Prize
 2000: Grand Slam: Live at the Regatta Bar with Joe Lovano et al. (Telarc, 2000)
 2010: Live at Birdland with Joey Baron, Greg Osby, Steve LaSpina (ArtistShare, 2012)

Posthumous releases
 Charlie Haden/Jim Hall with Charlie Haden   (Impulse!, 2014) – recorded in 1990
 Jim Hall Live in London at Ronnie Scott's – 1966 with Jeff Clyne and Allan Ganley (Harkit Digital, 2016) – recorded in 1966
 Valse Hot: Live at the Sweet Basil 1978 with Red Mitchell (ArtistShare, 2016) – recorded in 1978

Compilation albums
All compilations were issued under Jim Hall's name unless otherwise indicated.
 1968: various artists - Berlin Festival Guitar Workshop (MPS Records) - track B1, "Careful / The Touch of Your Lips"; track B2, "You Stepped Out of a Dream" (with Barney Kessel)
 1969: various artists - All-Star White House Tribute to Duke Ellington (Blue Note)
 1983: Jim Hall (CTI) Japan-only release - collects three previously-released songs: "Concierto de Aranjuez," "Swan Lake," and "Pavane For A Dead Princess"
 1986: Sonny Rollins - The Quartets featuring Jim Hall (RCA) includes The Bridge along with 7 songs 1962 and 1964 that feature Jim Hall
 1987: The Paul Desmond Quartet with Jim Hall - The Complete Recordings Of The Paul Desmond Quartet With Jim Hall (Mosaic) the complete recordings of Paul Desmond with Jim Hall along with 12 previously unissued performances
 1992: Zoot Sims and His Orchestra featuring Jim Hall - Recado Bossa Nova (Fresh Sounds) collects songs from Sims's New Beat Bossa Nova albums
 1992: various artists - Santa's Bag: An All-Star Jazz Christmas (Telarc) - track 10, "O Tannenbaum"
 1993: various artists - A Jazz Valentine: In the Mood for Love (MusicMasters) - track 1, "I'm in the Mood for Love"
 1995: Jimmy Giuffre with Jim Hall - Trio & Quartet (Giants Of Jazz) Italian release
 1995: various artists - Color and Light: Jazz Sketches of Sondheim (Sony) - track 7, "One More Kiss"; track 10, "What Can You Lose?"
 1997: Paul Desmond featuring Jim Hall - The Complete RCA Victor Recordings (RCA Victor) includes all recordings of Paul Desmond with Jim Hall except the Warner Bros. album First Place Again
 1998: The Paul Desmond Quartet With Jim Hall - The Paul Desmond Quartet With Jim Hall (Giants Of Jazz) European release
 1998: The Concord Jazz Heritage Series (Concord) collects songs from Hall's albums on the Concord label
 2000: Ballad Essentials (Concord) spans 1981-1989; songs from Circles, Jim Hall's Three, All Across the City, First Edition, and Live at Village West
 2001: Mugonuta/Live in Tokyo (Atlas) includes Live in Tokyo album plus four tracks from Jazz Impressions of Japan
 2001: Jim Hall and Ron Carter - Telepathy  (Concord) reissue of the albums Live At Village West and Telephone
 2002: Storyteller (Concord) reissue of the albums Circles and All Across the City
 2002: Downbeat Critic's Choice (Telarc) collects 12 songs from albums Hall recorded between 1995-2001 for Telarc
 2004: The Unreleased Sessions (Lone Hill Jazz) collects two Buddy Collette albums (Porgy & Bess and At the Cinema!) plus four songs from Tanganyika
 2005: CTI Best Of Jim Hall (CTI) 
 2006: Hallmarks: The Best of Jim Hall's (Concord Jazz) includes songs from his albums on the Concord and Telarc labels
 2009: various artists - Douglas on Blue Note (WienerWorld / Douglas) ' track 8, "My Funny Valentine" with Bill Evans
 2011: The Complete "Jazz Guitar" (Essential Jazz Classics) - contains complete (unedited) versions of songs from the Jazz Guitar album, plus 5 bonus tracks
 2018: Wonderboy (Nagel-Heyer Records) collect 27 songs

EPs
 1958: Jazz Guitar: Jim Hall Trio EP (Pacific Jazz / Vogue) - songs: A1: "Stompin' at the Savoy"; A2: "This is Always"; B1: "Thanks for the Memory"

Singles
 1957: "Satin Doll" (The Chico Hamilton Quintet) / "Stella by Starlight" (The Jim Hall Trio) (Pacific Jazz)

Tribute albums
 2014: Ron Carter - In Memory of Jim (Sonethin' Else) with Larry Coryell and Peter Bernstein
 2014: Kim Ji Hoon and Ahn Jae Jin - Locutions: A Tribute to Jim Hall (Audioguy)
 2014: Satoshi Inoue - Plays Jim Hall (What's New)

As backing musician

A–C
 With Nat Adderley 
 1960: That's Right! (Riverside)
 1963: Little Big Horn (album) (Riverside)

 With Manny Albam 
 1962: Jazz Goes to the Movies (Impulse!)

 With Anamari 
 1964: Anamari (Atlantic)

 With Ruby Braff 
 1958: Ruby Braff Goes Girl Crazy (Warner Bros.)

 With Buddy Bregman and his Dance Band 
 1959: Swingin' Standards (World Pacific)

 With Bob Brookmeyer 
 1957: Traditionalism Revisited (World Pacific)
 1958: Kansas City Revisited (United Artists)
 1961:7 x Wilder (Verve)
 1962: Trombone Jazz Samba (Verve)
 1958: On the Way to the Sky (Jazzline/Delta Music, released in 2016) with Mel Lewis and the WDR Big Band, from a 1958 radio broadcast

 With Paul Bryant 
 1960: Burnin (Pacific Jazz) reissued in 2010 by Fresh Sound on one CD along with The Blues Message by Paul Bryant and Curtis Amy.

 With Gary Burton 
 1963: Something's Coming! (RCA)
 1992: Six Pack (GRP)

 With Bill Charlap 
 2002: Stardust guest appearance on 1 track (Blue Note)

 With June Christy 
 1959: Recalls Those Kenton Days (Capitol; reissued on CD in 2001)

 With Ornette Coleman 
 1972: Broken Shadows (Columbia, released 1982) also released in 2000 as part of The Complete Science Fiction Sessions (Columbia)

 With Buddy Collette 
 1956: Tanganyika (Dig)
 1957: Porgy & Bess (Interlude, released 1959)
 1959: Buddy Collette and His Swinging Shepherds At the Cinema! (Mercury)

D–G
 With Paul Desmond 
 1959: First Place Again (Warner Bros) also released as East of the Sun in 1981
 1961: Desmond Blue (RCA Victor) also released as Late Lament with bonus tracks
 1962: Two of a Mind (RCA Victor) with Gerry Mulligan (Hall only present on two outtakes added to CD reissue)
 1963: Take Ten (RCA Victor)
 1964: Glad To Be Unhappy (RCA Victor)
 1964: Bossa Antigua (RCA Victor)
 1965: Easy Living (RCA Victor)

 With Eric Dolphy and John Lewis 
 1960: Play Kurt Weill (Lone Hill Jazz) released in 2008 - complete Mike Zwerin album of the music of Kurt Weill; tracks 1-7 released in 1965 as Mack The Knife And Other Berlin Theatre Songs Of Kurt Weill

 With Bill Evans 
 1962: Interplay (Riverside)
 1962: Loose Blues (Milestone, released 1982)
 1963: Undercurrent (United Artists)
 1966:  Intermodulation (Verve)

 With Art Farmer 
 1962: Listen to Art Farmer and the Orchestra (Mercury)
 1963: Interaction (Atlantic)
 1963: Live at the Half-Note (Atlantic)
 1964: To Sweden with Love (Atlantic) - released in Sweden as Visa På Annorlunda Vis
 2008: The Complete Live Recordings (Gambit) - includes Live at the Half-Note plus a previously unofficially-released set recorded live in London on June 27, 1964

 With Ella Fitzgerald 
 1960: Ella in Berlin: Mack the Knife (Verve)
 1961: Ella in Hollywood (Verve) actually Herb Ellis; initially incorrectly attributed to Jim Hall

 With Stan Getz 
 1962: Big Band Bossa Nova (Verve)
 1966 Stan Getz & Arthur Fiedler at Tanglewood (Verve) also released as A Song After Sundown in 1988
 1966: Voices (Verve, released 1967)
 1968: What the World Needs Now: Stan Getz Plays Burt Bacharach and Hal David (Verve)

 With Jimmy Giuffre 
 1957: The Jimmy Giuffre 3 (Atlantic)
 1957-58 Hollywood & Newport 1957–1958 (Fresh Sound, released 1992)
 1958: Trav'lin' Light (Atlantic)
 1958: The Four Brothers Sound (Atlantic)
 1958: Western Suite (Atlantic)
 1959: Herb Ellis Meets Jimmy Giuffre (Verve) with Herb Ellis
 1959 Seven Pieces (Verve)
 1959: The Easy Way (Verve)
 1959: Princess (Fini Jazz) Italian release - recorded at Adriano Theatre, Rome, Italy, June 19, 1959
 1960: The Jimmy Giuffre Quartet in Person  (Verve)
 2006: Complete Studio Recordings (Gambit Spain)

H–M
 With Bobby Hackett 
 1955: From the Jazz Vault (From the Jazz Vault, released 1979)

 With Chico Hamilton 
 1955: Chico Hamilton Quintet featuring Buddy Collette (Pacific Jazz)
 1955: The Original Chico Hamilton Quintet (World Pacific, released 1960)
 1955: Live at the Strollers (Fresh Sound) released 2008
 1956: Chico Hamilton Quintet in Hi Fi (Pacific Jazz)
 1956: Chico Hamilton Trio (Pacific Jazz)
 1957: Delightfully Modern (Jazztone) with the Laurindo Almeida Quartet
 1959: Ellington Suite (World Pacific)

 With Herbie Hancock 
 1967: Blow-Up (MGM)

 With Ken Hanna and His Orchestra 
 1955: Jazz for Dancers (Capitol)

 With Johnny Hartman 
 1964: I Just Dropped By to Say Hello (Impulse)

 With Hampton Hawes 
 1956: All Night Session! Vol. 1 (Contemporary, released 1958)
 1956: All Night Session! Vol. 2 (Contemporary, released 1958)
 1956: All Night Session! Vol. 3 (Contemporary, released 1958)

 With Lurlean Hunter 
 1960: Blue & Sentimental (Atlantic)

 With Pete Jolly 
 1962: The Sensational Pete Jolly Gasses Everybody (Charlie Parker)

 With Quincy Jones 
 1962: Big Band Bossa Nova (Mercury)
 1963: Quincy Jones Plays Hip Hits (Mercury)
 1964: Golden Boy (Mercury)
 1965: Quincy Plays for Pussycats (Mercury)
 1971: Smackwater Jack (A&M)

 With Roger Kellaway 
 1963: A Portrait of Roger Kellaway (Regina/Fresh Sound)

 With Lee Konitz 
 1959: You and Lee (Verve)
 1967: The Lee Konitz Duets (Milestone Records)

 With the Kronos Quartet 
 1986: Music of Bill Evans (Savoy)

 With Rolf Kühn 
 1960: Rolf Kühn And His Sound Of Jazz (Urania Records)

 With John Lewis 
 1956: Grand Encounter (Pacific Jazz)
 1957: The John Lewis Piano (Atlantic)
 1960: The Wonderful World of Jazz (Atlantic)
 1962: Essence (Atlantic)

M–P
 With Charlie Mariano 
 1963: A Jazz Portrait of Charlie Mariano (Regina Records)

 With Gary McFarland 
 1962: The Jazz Version of "How to Succeed in Business without Really Trying" (Verve)

 With Marian McPartland 
 2005: 85 Candles: Live in New York (Concord)

 With Helen Merrill 
 1965: Deep in a Dream (Milestone) with Dick Katz - reissued in 1967 as The Feeling is Mutual
 1968: A Shade of Difference (Milestone) with Dick Katz
 1978: Something Special (Inner City)

 "With "Big" Miller" 
 1961: Revelations and the Blues (Columbia Records)

 With the Modest Jazz Trio 
 1960: Good Friday Blues (Disques Vogue)

 With the Modern Jazz Quartet 
 1960: Third Stream Music (Atlantic) with the Jimmy Giuffre Three* and the Beaux Arts String Quartet

 With Jack Montrose 
 1956: Blues and Vanilla (RCA Victor)
 1957: The Horn's Full (RCA Victor)

 With James Moody 
 1963: Great Day (Argo)

 With Gerry Mulligan 
 1963: The Concert Jazz Band - Gerry Mulligan '63 (Verve)
 1963: Night Lights (Philips)
 1964: Butterfly with Hiccups (Limelight)

 With Mark Murphy 
 1962: That's How I Love the Blues! (Riverside)

 With Oliver Nelson 
 1963: Full Nelson (Verve)
With Anita O'Day
Cool Heat (Verve, 1959)
 With Orchestra U.S.A. Musical Director, John Lewis 
 1963: Debut (Colpix)

 With Greg Osby 
 2000: The Invisible Hand (Blue Note)

 With Freda Payne 
 1964: After the Lights Go Down Low and Much More!!! (Impulse!)

 With Itzhak Perlman and André Previn 
 1980: A Different Kind of Blues (Angel)
 1981: It's a Breeze (Angel)

R–Z
 With Sonny Rollins 
 1962: The Bridge (RCA Victor)
 1962: What's New? (RCA Victor)
 1964: The Standard Sonny Rollins (RCA Victor)
 2010: Road Shows Vol. 2 guest appearance on 1 track (EmArcy, released 2011)

 With Shorty Rogers, Gary McFarland, Xavier Cugat 
 1993: Brazil  (Saludos Amigos)

 With Annie Ross 
 1959: Gypsy (World Pacific) with Buddy Bregman & His Orchestra
 1959: A Gasser! (Capitol Records) with Zoot Sims

 With Lalo Schifrin 
 1962: Piano, Strings and Bossa Nova (MGM)

 With Zoot Sims 
 1959: Choice (World Pacific Records)
 1962: New Beat Bossa Nova Vol. 1 (Colpix)
 1962: New Beat Bossa Nova Vol. 2 (Colpix)

 With Sonny Stitt 
 1964 Stitt Plays Bird (Atlantic)

 With Carol Sloane 
 1962: Out of the Blue (Columbia, 1962)

 With Bill Smith 
 1959: Folk Jazz (Contemporary)

 With Billy Taylor 
 1962: Impromptu (Mercury)

 With Big Joe Turner 
 1960: Big Joe Rides Again (Atlantic Records)

 With Vi Velasco and Zoot Sims
 1962: Cantando Bossa Nova Means Singing The Bossa Nova (Colpix Records)

 With Ben Webster 
 1960: Ben Webster at the Renaissance (Contemporary)

Music videos
 1995: Legends Of Jazz Guitar Vol.3 VHS (Vestapol) Jim Hall, Tal Farlow et al. - reissued on DVD in 2002
 1998: Jim Hall Jazz Guitar Master Class, Vol. 1: Jazz Basics / the Principles of Improvisation VHS (Alfred Music) also released in 2000 by Hal Leonard
 1998: Jim Hall Jazz Guitar Master Class, Vol. 2: Advanced Concepts / Self Expression VHS (Alfred Music)
 1998: Jim Hall Jazz Guitar Master Class, Vol. 3: Playing With a Group / Interaction VHS (Alfred Music)
 1998: Jim Hall: A Life in Progress DVD (Rhapsody) produced by Bruce Ricker
 2000: Jim Hall: Star Licks (Hal Leonard) 
 2001: Jazz Casual: Art Farmer & Jim Hall VHS (Rhino) from January 1964 Ralph J. Gleason “Jazz Casual” TV appearance - reissued on DVD in 2003 by Idem with Gerry Mulligan Quartet video
 2006: Jim Hall: Instructional DVD for Guitar DVD Hal Leonard 
 2008: Sonny Rollins and Jim Hall: The Bridge DVD (Salt Peanuts) includes Sonny Rollins and Jim Hall (San Francisco 1962) and Jim Hall with Art Farmer (San Francisco 1964)
 2009 (1973 & 1980): Jim Hall, Jimmy Raney, and Attila Zoller - Guitar Masters: Live in Germany 1973 & 1980  DVD (As Is) released 2009

Music books
 1990: Jim Hall - Exploring Jazz Guitar (Hal Leonard) 
 1994: Jim Hall: Jazz Guitar Environments (Hal Leonard)  transcriptions taken from Star Licks video
 2005: The Best of Jim Hall (Hal Leonard) 
 2006: Adam Perlmutter and Jim Hall - Jim Hall Guitar Signature Licks (Hal Leonard)  book and CD combination

External links
 
 Jim Hall's fan website
 
 
 

Jazz discographies
Discographies of American artists